Jaime Ray Newman (born April 2, 1978) is an American actress, producer and singer. She is known for starring as Kristina Cassadine in the soap opera General Hospital, Mindy O'Dell in the drama series Veronica Mars, Kat Gardener in the fantasy series Eastwick, Lt. Laura Cadman in the science-fiction series Stargate Atlantis, Tess Fontana in the science-fiction series Eureka, Kat Petrova in the drama-thriller series Red Widow, Sam Gordon in the comedy-drama series Mind Games, Allison Roth in the crime drama series Wicked City, and Sarah Lieberman in the Marvel series The Punisher.

Along with her husband Guy Nattiv, she won the Academy Award for Best Live Action Short Film in 2019 for producing the drama Skin (2018).

Early life
Newman was born in Farmington Hills, Michigan, to  Jewish parents, Marsha Jo and Raphael Newman. She has one sister, Beth Nicole, a global public relations director at J Brand. Newman started performing at age eleven in the debut of Israel Horovitz's play A Rosen by Any Other Name. She worked consistently around Detroit, acting in many of the regional theaters. Newman received her elementary education at the Jewish Hillel Day School of Metropolitan Detroit, where she starred as Ado Annie Carnes in an eighth-grade play of Oklahoma!

After Hillel, Newman attended the private Cranbrook Kingswood School in Bloomfield Hills, Michigan, and spent her summers at the Interlochen Center for the Arts where she won the Corson Award for Outstanding Achievement in Acting. While in high school at Cranbrook, she won first place in the Michigan Interscholastic Forensic Association, a statewide dramatic competition, for three years in a row. At age 16, Newman founded Apollo Theatre Productions, serving as both a producer and director. She graduated from Cranbrook in 1996. Newman then attended Boston University College of Fine Arts' theater conservatory for two years, before transferring to Northwestern University as an English and drama major.

At Northwestern, she founded the Ignition Festival for Women in the Arts. Through that, she produced and acted in Paula Vogel's Pulitzer Prize-winning play How I Learned to Drive. While living in Chicago, she performed with her own jazz quartet. Newman moved to Los Angeles in September 2000. Her cousin is actor Ben Kurland.

Career
Newman first earned a living performing with her jazz quartet, and landed parts in several short films. She also made an appearance on The Drew Carey Show. Soon after, she landed the role of Kristina Cassadine on the soap opera General Hospital. While there, she continued with her music career, putting together her cover band, School Boy Crush. Newman and School Boy Crush played regularly at The Buffalo Club in Santa Monica, California; Moomba in West Hollywood; Nick's Martini Lounge; Café Cordiale; and at the Lux in Beverly Hills. The band covered a wide variety of music from funk and soul to R&B and blues. Most recently, they played the ESPN Awards party at The Highlands, the adjoining venue to the Kodak Theatre. Newman also landed a part in Steven Spielberg's Catch Me If You Can, with a scene opposite Leonardo DiCaprio.

In January 2003, Newman starred with David Schwimmer, Jonathan Silverman and Tom Everett Scott in the play Turnaround, Roger Kumble's dark Hollywood satire. In October 2006, Newman began an eight-episode run in a recurring role in the critically acclaimed CW show Veronica Mars. She also became a fan favorite with her appearance on Stargate Atlantis as Lt. Laura Cadman. Along with fellow Stargate actor Michael Shanks, she appeared in the Christmas 2006 television film Under the Mistletoe. Other high-profile guest starring roles include E-Ring, Heroes, Supernatural, Related, CSI: Crime Scene Investigation, Medium, NCIS, Grimm, CSI: NY, and Castle.

In 2007, Newman starred in Neil LaBute's play Fat Pig at the Geffen Playhouse, and in 2008, starred in LaBute's play Some Girl(s), also at the Geffen. The following year, she appeared alongside Rebecca Romijn, Lindsay Price and Paul Gross in the 2009 television adaptation of Eastwick (based on the John Updike novel The Witches of Eastwick), playing Kat Gardener, a nurse and mother of five who discovers her magical powers. In 2010, she held major recurring roles on Eureka as Dr. Tess Fontana, and on Drop Dead Diva as Vanessa Hemmings. In January 2011, Newman played Cynthia Karslake in David Auburn's revival of The New York Idea by Langdon Elwyn Mitchell at the Lucille Lortel Theatre in New York City. In 2013, she starred opposite James Van Der Beek, Kathy Baker and Chris Mulkey in the American stage premiere of the Australian play The Gift at the Geffen Playhouse.

Newman starred with Radha Mitchell in ABC's 2013 midseason drama series Red Widow. That same year, she starred in the independent psychological thriller film Altered Minds. In May 2014, it was reported that she would guest star in an episode of TNT's comedy-drama Franklin & Bash. Later, she was cast as series regular in another ABC series, Mind Games, opposite Christian Slater and Steve Zahn. In August 2014, it was announced that Newman would recur on Amazon Studios' procedural drama Bosch. In August 2015, she joined the main cast of ABC's crime drama series Wicked City. In December 2015, Newman joined the fourth-season cast of Bates Motel as the major recurring character Rebecca Hamilton, a past love interest of Sheriff Romero (Nestor Carbonell). She will star in Lech Majewski's fantasy film Valley of the Gods, opposite Josh Hartnett and Charlotte Rampling.

In August 2016, she was cast in the recurring role of Wildred Darnell on the fifth season of TNT's procedural drama series Major Crimes. The following year, Newman began starring in the series regular role of Sarah Lieberman on Netflix's Marvel drama The Punisher, a spin-off series featuring the character from Daredevil. She then recurred as Irene McAllistair in the third season of the Syfy drama series The Magicians. Newman had a recurring role as Linda Langer in the second season of Bravo's dark comedy series Imposters. In 2018, she produced her first feature film, the biographical racial drama Skin, directed by her husband Guy Nattiv. For her work, she received the Academy Award for Best Live Action Short Film.

In 2022, Newman played Lucille Abshire in the HBO series The Time Traveler's Wife.

Personal life
Newman married Israeli writer and director Guy Nattiv in Tel Aviv, on April 2, 2012 (her 34th birthday). They have two daughters.

Filmography

Film

Television

Stage

References

External links

 

1978 births
21st-century American actresses
Actresses from Michigan
American film actresses
American soap opera actresses
American stage actresses
American television actresses
American voice actresses
Boston University College of Fine Arts alumni
Jewish American actresses
Living people
Northwestern University School of Communication alumni
People from Farmington Hills, Michigan
Producers who won the Live Action Short Film Academy Award
21st-century American Jews